Žvaigždžiakalnis is a village in the Molėtai district municipality, in Utena County, eastern Lithuania. According to the 2001 census, the village has a population of 4 people. The village is located in a remote area 10 km south east from Suginčiai, in a peninsula at the western edge of the Lake Aisetas. Žvaigždžiakalnis is surrounded by forest and is part of the Labanoras Regional Park.

Etymology 
The name Žvaigždžiakalnis came from Lithuanian words žvaigždė and kalnas and means "a mount of stars".

References

Villages in Utena County